Hellinsia integratus is a moth of the family Pterophoridae. It is found in North America.

References

Moths described in 1913
integratus
Moths of North America